Waldershare is a village near Dover in Kent, England. In 1086, the village was in the hundred of Eastry in the ancient Lathe of Eastry. By 1295 the ancient lathe had been merged into the Lathe of St. Augustine. In the 18th century, the noble family of Waldershare were lords of a manor in the parish of Shebbertswell. The population of the village is included in the civil parish of Shepherdswell with Coldred.

See also
All Saints Church, Waldershare

References

External links

Villages in Kent
Dover District